Louis Claude Vassé (1717 in Paris – 1772) was a French sculptor. He was the son and grandson of sculptors and a pupil of Edmé Bouchardon. He won the Prix de Rome and later became a member of the Académie royale de peinture et de sculpture. Among his best known works is the tomb of Stanislas Leszczyński at Nancy in the Église Notre-Dame-de-Bon-Secours.

Gallery

References

External links
Europe in the age of enlightenment and revolution, a catalog from The Metropolitan Museum of Art Libraries (fully available online as PDF), which contains material on this sculptor (see index)
 

1717 births
1772 deaths
18th-century French sculptors
French male sculptors
18th-century French male artists